Excelsior Geyser Crater, formerly known as Excelsior Geyser, is a dormant fountain-type geyser in the Midway Geyser Basin of Yellowstone National Park in the United States. Excelsior was named by the Hayden Geological Survey of 1871.

Description
The Excelsior Geyser pool discharges 4,000 to 4,500 gallons (15,100–17,000 L) of  water per minute directly into the Firehole River. In the late 19th century (and possibly 1901), it was an active geyser that erupted frequently. Most eruptions were about 100 feet high, although some exceeded  in both height and width. It is believed that the powerful eruptions damaged its internal plumbing system, and it now boils as a productive hot spring most of the time.

Activity
In 1985, Excelsior returned to activity for a 46-hour period from September 14 to 16. All of these eruptions lasted about 2 minutes at intervals of 5 to 66 minutes.

Between 2004 and 2006, Excelsior did have violent boiling strong enough to be considered as eruptions.

References

Geothermal features of Yellowstone National Park
Geysers of Wyoming
Geothermal features of Teton County, Wyoming
Geysers of Teton County, Wyoming